Awarua Satellite Ground Station (formerly Awarua Tracking Station) is an Earth station built initially to support  the European Space Agency Ariane 5 ES ATV  (Automated Transfer Vehicle) launch campaigns. Located in New Zealand, it was developed by Venture Southland, a joint committee of the Invercargill City Council, Southland District Council and Gore District Council.  

The site on Awarua Plains was chosen because of its high latitude, low horizons and isolation from sources of radio interference. It has a fibre-optic broadband link to the Internet.

The station was first used in 2008 to track Jules Verne, and subsequently four more  Automated Transfer Vehicles servicing the International Space Station.

The station now supports many of the well known names in the small-sat world.

Work with Planet Labs
In 2014 the Awarua Satellite Ground Station was chosen by Planet Labs to download some of the data from their 28 earth observation satellites called Flock-1. A 7-meter radome was constructed at the site to house the satellite dish that would download the data from the satellites.

References

Buildings and structures in Southland, New Zealand
European Space Agency
Earth stations in New Zealand